The Mask Project A is the fifth season of The Mask Singer, a Thai singing competition program presented by Kan Kantathavorn. It aired on Workpoint TV on Thursday at 20:05 from 28 June 2018 to 4 October 2018.

Panel of Judges

First round

Group 1 Jungle War

Group 2 Sky War

Group 3 Marine War

Semi-final

Group 1 Jungle War

Group 2 Sky War

Group 3 Marine War

Final

Champ VS Champ

Champ of the Champ

Celebration of The Mask Champion

Elimination table

The Mask Truce Day 
The Mask Truce Day is a Thai special program about guess singers in masks after the finished Project A series that aired 15 episodes. the word Truce means temporarily stay competitive.

This special program broadcast only 2 episodes presented by Kan Kantathavorn. It airs on Workpoint TV on Thursday at 20:05, starting from 11–18 October 2018.

References 

The Mask Singer (Thai TV series)
2018 Thai television seasons